Shijingshan Stadium (Simplified Chinese: 石景山体育场) is a multi-use stadium in Beijing, China. It is currently used primarily for football matches. The stadium holds 20,000 people. Stadium construction commenced in February 1981 and was completed in October 1986.

Footnotes

Football venues in Beijing
Sports venues in Beijing
Venues of the 1990 Asian Games